"Provider" is a song by American funk rock band N*E*R*D from their debut studio album, In Search Of....

The song was the third and final single from the album. It managed to gain minor popularity in Europe, making the charts in the Netherlands and Sweden. In the UK, it was released as a double a-side with a re-release of "Lapdance," peaking at number 20.

Music video

The video opens with two girls and a guy in a truck, the guy asking the two if they remember a guy named Shagg. Pharrell and Chad ride around with a bike gang interspersed with scenes of a young man (Brad Renfro) struggling to make ends meet and his pregnant girlfriend (Kelli Garner). She suggests he apply to the military, which he angrily rejects but reluctantly does. The video ends with Pharrell wearing camo and holding a little girl displaying the peace sign with other children around him doing the same. Tony Hawk and Travis Barker make a cameo in a convenience store scene, while Pusha T of the Clipse appears as a drug dealer.
For some unknown reason, this music video is no longer available on YouTube and any other streaming websites.

Track listing

UK CD single
 "Provider" (Zero 7 Remix Edit)
 "Provider" (Remix Radio Edit)
 "Lapdance" (Freeform Reform)
 "Provider" (Video)

Charts

References

2002 singles
N.E.R.D. songs
Song recordings produced by the Neptunes
Songs written by Pharrell Williams
Songs written by Chad Hugo